Sandy Mayer was the defending champion, but lost in the third round this year.

McEnroe successfully defended his title, defeating Tim Gullikson 6–2, 6–2 in the final.

The tournament featured the first ever meeting of John McEnroe and Björn Borg, in the semifinals.

Seeds

  Björn Borg (semifinals)
  Eddie Dibbs (first round)
  John McEnroe (champion)
  Brian Gottfried (third round)
  Corrado Barazzutti (first round)
  Harold Solomon (first round)
  Roscoe Tanner (third round)
  Sandy Mayer (third round)
  Ilie Năstase (third round)
  Arthur Ashe (quarterfinals)
  Dick Stockton (first round)
  Wojtek Fibak (semifinals)
  Tim Gullikson (final)
  John Lloyd (first round)
  Stan Smith (quarterfinals)
  Peter Fleming (quarterfinals)

Draw

Finals

Top half

Section 1

Section 2

Bottom half

Section 3

Section 4

See also
 Borg–McEnroe rivalry

External links
 Main draw

Stockholm Open
1978 Grand Prix (tennis)